Grand Duke Peter Nikolaevich of Russia (Russian: Пётр Никола́евич Рома́нов; 22 January [O.S. 10 January] 1864 – 17 June 1931) was a Russian Grand Duke and a member of the Russian Imperial Family.

Early life and marriage
Grand Duke Peter Nikolaevich was the second son of Grand Duke Nicholas Nicolaievich the Elder (1831–1891) and Duchess Alexandra of Oldenburg (1838–1900).

He was born in Saint Petersburg. As was the custom for Russian Grand Dukes (the title applied to all sons and grandsons of a Russian Emperor), the Grand Duke Peter served in the Russian army as a Lt.-General and Adjutant-General.

On 26 July 1889, he married Princess Milica of Montenegro (1866–1951), daughter of King Nicholas I of Montenegro (1841–1921). The Grand Duke and Duchess had four children:

Princess Marina Petrovna of Russia (1892–1981)
Prince Roman Petrovich of Russia (1896–1978)
Princess Nadezhda Petrovna of Russia (1898–1988)
Princess Sofia Petrovna of Russia (3 March 1898 – 3 March 1898); buried in the convent cemetery in Kiev by her grandmother, Grand Duchess Alexandra Petrovna, who was a nun there

Life at court
In 1907, his elder brother, Grand Duke Nicholas Nikolaevich, married Grand Duchess Militza's sister, Princess Anastasia of Montenegro, known as Stana. The two couples were socially very influential at the Russian Imperial Court in the early 20th century. The Grand Duke joined a cult nick-named "the black peril", a group interested in the occult. They are credited with introducing first a charlatan mystic named merely Philippe, and then, with graver consequences, Grigori Rasputin (1869–1916) to the Imperial family. Prince Felix Yussupov (1887–1967) – who was their neighbour in Koreiz –  once described Znamenka, the Grand Duke and Duchess's palace, as "the central point of the powers of evil". This was later to be a widely held belief within the higher echelons of the divided Russian court. The Dowager Empress Marie firmly believed that the couple plotted with Rasputin and others to gain influence and favours through the neurotic Empress Alexandra (1872–1918). However, by 1914, Alexandra herself referred to them as "the black family" and felt herself to be manipulated by them.

Honours and awards
The Grand Duke received several Russian and foreign decorations:
Russian
Knight of St. Andrew, 1864
Knight of St. Alexander Nevsky, 1864
Knight of St. Anna, Knight 1st Class, 1864
Knight of the White Eagle, 1864
Knight of St. Stanislaus, 1st Class, 11 June 1865
Knight of St. Vladimir, 4th Class, 1887; 3rd Class, 1901; 2nd Class, 1911

Foreign
 Grand Duchy of Oldenburg: Grand Cross of the Order of Duke Peter Friedrich Ludwig, 12 July 1880
: Grand Cross of the Ludwig Order, 15 June 1884
 Kingdom of Prussia: Knight of the Black Eagle, 16 September 1884
 Grand Duchy of Baden:
 Knight of the House Order of Fidelity, 1885
 Knight of the Order of Berthold the First, 1885
: Grand Cross of the Legion of Honour, 4 March 1896
: Knight of the Most Holy Annunciation, 9 August 1900 - during a visit to Russia of King Victor Emmanuel III of Italy
: Grand Cross of the Order of Prince Danilo I

Exile
The couple escaped the Russian Revolution to the south of France. Here Grand Duke Peter Nicholaievich died at Cap d'Antibes, near Antibes on 17 June 1931. His wife died in Alexandria, Egypt, in September 1951.

Ancestry

References

1864 births
1931 deaths
Royalty from Saint Petersburg
People from Sankt-Peterburgsky Uyezd
House of Holstein-Gottorp-Romanov
Russian grand dukes
Emigrants from the Russian Empire to Italy
Emigrants from the Russian Empire to France
White Russian emigrants to Italy
White Russian emigrants to France
19th-century people from the Russian Empire
Grand Croix of the Légion d'honneur